Lambridge Wood  is a  biological Site of Special Scientific Interest north-west of Henley-on-Thames in Oxfordshire. It is in the Chilterns Area of Outstanding Natural Beauty.

Soil types in the wood vary from calcareous to very acid. The main trees are beech, and other trees include oak, ash and wych elm. The understorey in mainly bramble, and in some areas bracken.

Access routes include a footpath from Henley through Badgemore Park Golf Club.

See also
List of Sites of Special Scientific Interest in Oxfordshire

References

 
Sites of Special Scientific Interest in Oxfordshire
Forests and woodlands of Oxfordshire